The 305th Tactical Fighter Squadron is a squadron of the 5th Air Wing of the Japan Air Self-Defense Force based at Nyutabaru Air Base, in Miyazaki Prefecture, Japan. It is equipped with Mitsubishi F-15J and Kawasaki T-4 aircraft.

History
The squadron was founded on at Hyakuri Air Base in Ibaraki Prefecture on December 1, 1978 with McDonnell Douglas F-4EJ aircraft at part of the 7th Air Wing. It replaced the 206th Tactical Fighter Squadron, which was disbanded. During this period the JASDF followed a system in which the numbering of a squadron was dependent on the type of aircraft it operated. Single digit squadrons operated the F-86F, 100-numbered squadrons operated the F-86D, 200-numbered squadrons operated the F-104J and the new squadrons operating the F-4 were numbered in the 300s. 

The squadron operated the F-4EJ for 15 years. On August 2, 1993 it upgraded to F-15J aircraft. On August 31 2016 it moved from Hyakuri Air Base to Nyutabaru Air Base, swapping with the F-4EJ Kai equipped 301st Tactical Fighter Squadron, which moved to Hyakuri.

In August 2018 Misa Matsushima, the first female fighter pilot in the JASDF, was assigned to the squadron.

Tail marking

The squadron's current tail marking is of a plum blossom over a Hinomaru. Kairaku-en park located in Mito near Hyakuri Air Base in Ibaraki Prefecture is famous for its hundreds of plum blossom trees. The squadron using a plum blossom as its tail marking also continues the tradition of its predecessor the 206th TFS. That squadron used a different plum blossom design on the tails of its aircraft.

Aircraft operated

Fighter aircraft
 McDonnell Douglas F-4EJ (1978-1993)
 Mitsubishi F-15J (1993-present)

Liaison aircraft
 Lockheed T-33A (1978-1993)
 Kawasaki T-4 (1992-present)

See also
 Fighter units of the Japan Air Self-Defense Force

References

Units of the Japan Air Self-Defense Force
Military units and formations established in 1978
1978 establishments in Japan